Martin Whatson (born 1984 in Norway) is a Norwegian stencil artist.

Techniques and styles 
Martin Whatson creates sculptures, stencils and spray paintings to produce relevant compositions both inside the gallery space and in the arena of public art and Ewalls.

Exhibitions 
In 2017, Whatson solo exhibition "Revive", curated by Rom Levy was held in Santa Monica, California.

Solo exhibitions 
 2017 –                                   Revive – Santa Monica / USA
 2016 –                                   Affinity (collaboration with SNIK) Modus Art Gallery– Paris / France
 2015 –                                   Old News Galleri-A-Oslo / Norway
 2015 –                                   About-Face –  Blackbook Galle      –         Denver / USA
 2014 –                                   Hide & Seek-      Rex-      London / UK
 2014 –                                   Nationalteateret-    Nationalteateret-    Oslo / Norway
 2014 –                                   Square-    Galle-        Oslo / Norway
 2013 –                                   Transformed-Gallery Kawamatsu-okyo / Japan
 2013 –                                   Undercover-Reed Project-Stavanger / Norway
 2013 –                                   The Beauty of Grey-     MSA Gallery-Paris / France
 2011 –                                   What have i done?    – Black Pop Galler-          Copenhagen / Denmark
 2011 –                                   Love Tour   – Gallery Kawamatsu–Tokyo / Japan

References

External links 
https://creators.vice.com/en_us/article/nuart-street-art-buses-stavanger-norway
http://www.huffingtonpost.com/entry/nuart-aberdeen-2017-already-has-locals-saying-haste-ye-back_us_58f76523e4b0c892a4fb740c
http://www.huffingtonpost.com/jaime-rojo-steven-harrington/parade-of-eyepopping-beau_b_13473998.html
http://www.latimes.com/travel/deals/la-tr-las-vegas-murals-20170221-story.html

1984 births
Living people
Norwegian graffiti artists